Walter Casaroli (born April 13, 1957 in Rome) is an Italian former professional footballer who played as a midfielder.

He played 4 seasons (55 games, 8 goals) in Serie A for Roma and Empoli.

References

1957 births
Living people
Italian footballers
Association football midfielders
Serie A players
A.S. Roma players
Como 1907 players
Parma Calcio 1913 players
Delfino Pescara 1936 players
Empoli F.C. players
U.S. Triestina Calcio 1918 players